Swimming at the 2016 South Asian Games were held in Guwahati, India from 10 – 15 February 2016.

Medalists

Men's events

Women's events

Medal table

References

External links
Official website

Swimming at the South Asian Games
2016 South Asian Games
Events at the 2016 South Asian Games
South Asian Games